KWON (1400 AM) is a radio station licensed to Bartlesville, Oklahoma, United States. It carries a News/Talk format. The station is currently owned by Kcd Enterprises, Inc.

Translators

References

External links

WON
News and talk radio stations in the United States